José Walter Gavito (born January 4, 1935, in La Plata city, Provincia of Buenos Aires, d. 8 June 2017 in Buenis Aires) was an Argentine sculptor of international fame.

His name is so tied with Italian artists like Enrico Manfrini, Lello Scorselli, Francesco Mesina, with the Museo d'Arte Contemporanea of Milan and the Pagani's foundation (Italy)

External links
 Web site

Argentine sculptors
Argentine male artists
Male sculptors
1935 births
Living people